Sentences is an oratorio for countertenor and orchestra based on the life and work of the logician Alan Turing.  It was written by the American composer Nico Muhly with a libretto by Adam Gopnik.  The work was commissioned by the Britten Sinfonia and was first performed on June 6, 2015, by the countertenor Iestyn Davies and the Britten Sinfonia under Muhly.

Composition
Sentences has a duration of roughly 30 minutes and is composed in six parts with a coda.  Muhly described the inspiration for the piece in the score program notes, writing:
He added:

Instrumentation
The work is scored for a solo countertenor and an orchestra comprising flute, oboe, clarinet, bassoon, trombone, bass trombone, percussion, celesta, and strings.

Reception
Reviewing the world premiere, Tim Ashley of The Guardian lauded, "'No one wants a gay martyr oratorio,' Muhly has said. Indeed, the tone is alternately celebratory and sorrowful. His post-minimalist, asymmetric rhythms suggest the excitement of intellectual discovery. A quiet elegy for Morcom forms the work's touching kernel."  Hannah Nepil of the Financial Times similarly wrote:

References

Compositions by Nico Muhly
2014 compositions
Oratorios
Music commissioned by the Britten Sinfonia